The Kamila Skolimowska Memorial (or Kamila Skolimowska Throwing Festival) is an annual track and field meeting held at the Silesian Stadium in Chorzów, Poland in July, organized by the Kamila Skolimowska Foundation.

The inaugural edition took place at the RKS Skra Stadium in Warsaw in 2009, the next editions were held at Warsaw's Orzeł Stadium until it moved to National Stadium in 2014. From 2018 onwards the meeting moved to Chorzów. In 2020 the meeting was part of the inaugural World Athletics Continental Tour. Since 2022, the event has been part of the Diamond League series.

Meet records

Men

Women

See also
Sport in Poland
Copernicus Cup
Janusz Kusociński Memorial
Irena Szewińska Memorial

References

External links
Official website

European Athletic Association meetings
Recurring sporting events established in 2009
Athletics competitions in Poland
2009 establishments in Poland
Sport in Chorzów
Monuments and memorials in Poland